Zarandin-e Olya (also Romanized as Zarandīn-e ‘Olyā; also known as Bālā Zarandīn and Zarandīn-e Bālā) is a village in Peyrajeh Rural District, in the Central District of Neka County, Mazandaran Province, Iran. At the 2006 census, its population was 740, in 171 families.

References 

Populated places in Neka County